Fahrenheit is the sixth studio album by Toto, released in 1986. It was their first album to feature Joseph Williams on lead vocals. Former lead singer Fergie Frederiksen was fired due to problems with his ability in the studio. However, he sings backing vocals on the song "Could This Be Love". It was also the last Toto album until Toto XIV in 2015 to feature keyboardist Steve Porcaro as a permanent member, as he left after the Fahrenheit tour. The album failed to go gold until 1994, but featured two top forty singles in  "I'll Be Over You" (#11, #13 Can.) and "Without Your Love" (#38, #77 Can.). "I'll Be Over You" featured Michael McDonald on backing vocals, who also made an appearance in the song's music video. Singer/dancer Paula Abdul appears in the video for the third single, "Till The End." The final song "Don't Stop Me Now" features Miles Davis on trumpet.

Track listing

Personnel

Toto 
 Joseph Williams – lead vocals , backing vocals
 Steve Lukather – guitars, backing vocals, lead vocals 
 David Paich – keyboards, backing vocals
 Steve Porcaro – synthesizers
 Mike Porcaro – bass guitar
 Jeff Porcaro – drums, percussion

Additional musicians 
 Amin Bhatia – synthesizer intro 
 Lenny Castro – percussion 
 Paulinho da Costa – percussion 
 "Sidney" – percussion 
 Joe Porcaro – percussion 
 Steve Jordan – percussion 
 Jim Keltner – percussion 
Tom Scott – saxophones 
 Larry Williams – saxophones 
 David Sanborn – saxophone 
 Charles Loper – trombone 
 Bill Reichenbach Jr. – trombone 
 Chuck Findley – trumpet 
 Gary Grant – trumpet 
 Jerry Hey – trumpet , additional horn arrangements 
 Miles Davis – trumpet 
 Michael Sherwood – backing vocals 
 Paulette Brown – backing vocals 
 Tony Walthes – backing vocals 
 Michael McDonald – backing vocals 
 Fergie Frederiksen – backing vocals 
 Don Henley – backing vocals

Production 
 Arranged and Produced by Toto
 Engineers – Tom Knox and Shep Lonsdale
 Additional Engineering – Dan Garcia, Murray Dvorkin, John Jessel, Julie Last, Doug Linnell, Teruo "Mu" Murakami, Jack Joseph Puig, Mike Ross and Duane Seykora.
 Technicians – Keith Albright, Brent Averill, Bob Bradshaw, Paul Jamieson, John Jessel, Art Kelm, Roger Linn, Roger Nichols and Eli Slawson.
 Mixing – Greg Ladanyi  and Tom Knox 
 Mastered by Bob Ludwig at Masterdisk (New York City, NY).
 Production Coordination – Chris Littleton
 Art Direction – Tony Lane and Nancy Donald
 Photography – Michael Going
 Sleeve Photography – Jim Shea
 Management – Larry Fitzgerald and Mark Hartley at Fitzgerald Hartley Co.

Additional notes
Catalogue: (CD) Columbia CK-40273

Charts

Weekly charts

Certifications

References 

1986 albums
Toto (band) albums
Columbia Records albums
Funk rock albums by American artists
Rhythm and blues albums by American artists

it:Fahrenheit (disambigua)#Musica